Don Bosco Technical Institute (commonly called "Bosco Tech" or "The Tech") is an all-boys (grades 9-12), private, Catholic high school in Rosemead, California, combining college-preparatory academic courses and technological education. The academic curriculum allows students to meet, or exceed, the admission requirements of the University of California, California State University and most other four-year colleges and universities throughout the country.

Background
Don Bosco Technical Institute (Bosco Tech) was established as a high school in 1954 through the cooperative efforts of the Roman Catholic Archdiocese of Los Angeles, the Salesian Society, as well as industrial and business leaders of the Greater Los Angeles Area.

Bosco Tech offers a wide variety of extracurricular activities as well as sports. The school is based on Catholic values. Students of any faith or religious persuasion may attend.

The school is located in the San Gabriel Valley, 10 miles (16 km) east of downtown Los Angeles, just north of the Pomona Freeway (SR 60) in the city of Rosemead, California. It occupies approximately thirty acres. At the time the school was founded the area was known as South San Gabriel.  City borders around it were changed, and it is now in Rosemead.

Academics
Academically, the school sees other local schools (Loyola, La Salle, Crespi, St. Francis, Bishop Amat, Serra, Cantwell Sacred Heart of Mary, and Cathedral) as peers, though none have the technology education offered by the Tech.

Don Bosco Technical Institute is also close in proximity to two other Salesian-based high schools, Salesian in Boyle Heights and St. John Bosco in Bellflower. Its students hail from all over the Greater Los Angeles area, with some students traveling more than an hour's commute each day to the school.

Bosco Tech offers 6 Honors and 16 Advanced Placement (AP) classes from freshman to senior year.

Advanced Placement courses at Bosco Tech include:

Biology
Calculus AB
Calculus BC
Chemistry
Computer Science A
English Language and Composition
English Literature and Composition
Environmental Science
Human Geography
Macroeconomics
Physics C: Mechanics
Spanish Language and Culture
Spanish Literature and Culture
Statistics
United States Government and Politics
United States History

Honors courses at Bosco Tech include:

Biology
Chemistry
English 1-2
English 3-4
English 5-6
World History

Technology
In addition to the academic program, all students are required to participate in the school's pre-engineering/technology program and declare a major in one of six technology fields:

 ACE — Architecture and Construction Engineering
 BMET — Biological, Medical, and Environmental Technology
 CSEE — Computer Science and Electrical Engineering
 IDEA — Integrated Design, Engineering and Art
 MAT — Media Arts and Technology
 MSET — Materials Science, Engineering and Technology

All entering freshmen are required to attend a mandatory summer program prior to their ninth-grade year. This program includes a five-week Principles of Engineering class and an intensive math, English and study skills seminar. The seminar is similar to the summer bridge program offered at most universities and prepares students for the rigors of Bosco Tech's math and science curriculum.

In the fall semester, the freshmen enroll in three, six-week introductory technology courses chosen from the school's six technology departments. After their first semester of study, freshman students will select a technology major. They will remain in that major for the duration of their ninth-grade year and for the proceeding three years. It is important to note, the sequential nature of the technology coursework makes it difficult for transfer students after the tenth grade and will require all transfer students to complete summer coursework.

Athletics
The athletic teams participate in the Camino Real League and the Del Rey League. The school's rivals are Mary Star of the Sea, Cantwell Sacred Heart of Mary, and La Salle High School.

The Athletic Program at Bosco Tech consists of: 
Baseball
Basketball
Cross Country
Football
Golf
Soccer
Tennis
Track & Field
Volleyball

Student life

Clubs and Organizations
Since the opening of the school, it has offered a variety of diverse student organizations and clubs, including:

The school has been recognized for its renowned debate team, which has competed and placed successfully in local and national debate tournaments, even though mainly composed of underclassmen. For the first time in the school's history, it sent a Public Forum Debate Team to the National Championships held in June 2008 in Las Vegas, Nevada. This team was composed of junior classmen Evan Godfrey and Aris Govjian.

The school also has a special relationship with its "sister schools": Ramona Convent in Alhambra; San Gabriel Mission High School in San Gabriel; and Alverno in Sierra Madre; The school participates with its sister schools in several activities and organizations:
The Bosco Tech Yell, Cheer, Pep flags and Mascot program
The yearly March for Hunger, by walking  from Salazar Park in Los Angeles to Santa Monica Beach while raising money for the Los Angeles Catholic Worker's Hospitality Kitchen with Ramona Convent, Damien High School in La Verne, California and St. Paul High School in Santa Fe Springs, California
As of the 2019-2020 year, Bosco Tech's Music Program and the FRC Robotics Club now take in students from sister schools to participate.

Music program

The music program at Bosco Tech consists of:
Marching Band
Wind Ensemble
Percussion Ensemble
Jazz Band
Jazz Honor Band
Music Appreciation

Music education was emphasized as one of the main focuses of Don Bosco's educational approach. Therefore, since the school's birth in 1955, the "Bosco Tech Royal Techmen Marching Band" became the school's first and oldest extracurricular activity. Bosco Tech's music program was founded in 1957. Its most famous band director was Brother Eugene Burns, who directed the band from 1957 to 1978. In the 1970-1971 season, the auxiliary units were formed by San Gabriel Mission only until 1980s, when girls from Ramona Convent joined the units. The band had marched 70+ members in the 1970s, but, in recent years, band membership has averaged 35–40 members. Despite its relatively small size, the marching band and the auxiliary units have scored high points in their division and have even received sweepstakes.

The marching band is known throughout the state as "the band with the cannon". Its trademark cannon, made on the school premises, was fired and pulled by two students in front of the band during band reviews and parades in various Southern California cities, such as Arcadia, Temple City, Long Beach, Montebello, Azusa and San Francisco. The band has also appeared in the Los Angeles County Fair, a University of Southern California football game, the California 500 Speedway in Ontario, Disneyland's "America on Parade", Dodger Stadium, San Francisco's Columbus Day Parade, the Hawaii Invitational Music Festival, the Kennedy Space Center, Sea World San Diego and Universal Studios Florida.

During the Winter of the 2017-18 school year, the band's membership grew to 48 members. During this time there were more students involved in the band than the football team.

The next year, in the 2018-19 school year, the band opened its registration to its sister schools:San Gabriel Mission and Ramona Convent, as those schools did not have proper music programs. For the first time in 61 years, the Bosco Tech Music Program features players of both genders.

Culture
 One of the school's original cheers celebrated the inherent "geek" status of the students at a technical high school.

 In 1975 Bosco Tech paid $200 to the then "garage-band" Van Halen to perform at a campus music show.
Black Eyed Peas performed at Bosco Tech's end-of-year dance back in 2001
Black Eyed Peas filmed the music video for their song "Big Love" during the summer of 2018 at Bosco Tech.
 The current mascot, the Tiger, was adopted after a student vote in 1986. The historic mascot of the school is the "Techman."
The school has one of the oldest high school Kairos retreat programs in Southern California. Students have been going on the retreat since the 1980s.

Twice a school year, during fall and spring, the students participate in the Salesian Spirit Games. In these games the 6 technologies compete against each other in different sports. Each grade level is given a sport to compete in: 
Volleyball (Freshman)
Soccer (Sophomores)
Basketball (Juniors)
Football (Seniors)

The winner of the Salesian Spirit Games is awarded the Salesian Cup. In addition to sports, the 6 technologies compete for spirit. The Tech with the most spirit displayed throughout the games wins the Spirit Cup.

Notable alumni
 Wayne Engelstad, former NBA Basketball player, Denver Nuggets
 Paul Crespo, media commentator
 Jose Luis Gonzalez, founder of Goez Art Studio, 1969, the first Chicano arts organization that was developed to promote the work of Chicano artists.
 Michael Garciaparra, former professional baseball player
 Ken Gushi, professional drift car racer (attended, but did not graduate)
 Josh Lakatos, former Olympic target shooter and semi-professional Quarter Midget race car driver.
 Alex Meruelo, owner of the Arizona Coyotes
 Nick Spano, actor
 Michael Trevino, actor
 Jay Hernandez, actor (attended, but did not graduate)

See also
 St. John Bosco High School
 Ramona Convent Secondary School

References

Boys' schools in California
Roman Catholic secondary schools in Los Angeles County, California
Rosemead, California
Salesian schools
Salesian secondary schools
1955 establishments in California
Educational institutions established in 1955
Catholic secondary schools in California